Collegiate School is an independent school for boys in New York City.  It claims to be the oldest school in the United States.  It is located on the Upper West Side of Manhattan and is a member of both the New York Interschool and the Ivy Preparatory School League. It is ranked as one of the best private schools in the United States. In 2020–2021, tuition fees totaled $55,900 per year.

History
Collegiate was chartered as part of the Reformed Dutch Protestant Church in the Dutch colony of New Amsterdam in 1628 by the Dutch West India Company and the Classis of Amsterdam. Its initial incarnation was a co-ed school located south of Canal Street. The institution's location has changed seventeen times over the last four centuries.

Founding date controversy
In 1984, Massimo Maglione, a historian and Upper School teacher at Collegiate, discovered a letter that Collegiate's founder—the Reverend Jonas Michaëlius, the first minister of the Dutch Reformed Church in America—had written in 1628 about his efforts to teach the catechism to Indian children. Based on this letter, the school controversially moved up the year of its establishment to 1628. While Reverend Jonas Michaëlius did arrive in New Amsterdam in 1628 and may have worked as an educator at that time, Collegiate School was not chartered until 1638, placing its founding two years after the founding of Harvard University and three years after the founding of Boston Latin School.

Location
On February 5, 2013, the Collegiate School board announced plans to move the school to a new facility in New York's Riverside South neighborhood, between West End Avenue and Riverside Boulevard and between West 61st and 62nd Streets. Board Chairman George R. Bason, Jr. '72 said the new 178,000-square-foot school would provide 30% more indoor space and more than six times more outdoor space (16,268 square feet) for its 648 students from kindergarten through 12th grade than the existing lodgings provided. He estimated the new school's construction cost at $125–$135 million. On January 12, 2018, Collegiate officially opened its new location at 301 Freedom Place South.

School seal and mottos
Collegiate's seal is an adaptation of the coat of arms of William of Orange, who founded the Dutch Republic and the Reformed Church in that country and led the cause of independence and of freedom for the Reformed Church against Philip II of Spain. The History and Symbols Task Force recommended in its June 2020 report that the latter be replaced, owing to its explicitly religious nature and Collegiate's status as a secular institution.

Mascot

The school's mascot, generally interpreted as a caricature of Peter Stuyvesant, and often called "Peg Leg Pete" by students, has been the subject of recent controversy because of Stuyvesant's lack of religious tolerance, his vision for New Amsterdam as a slave depot, and his anti-Semitism. The school's History and Symbols Task Force, which completed its work in June 2020, concluded in its final report that the mascot be removed and a committee convened to solicit candidates for a replacement. The school's Board of Trustees voted to adopt the task force's recommendation, among the others in the report. In 2021, new mascots were proposed to and voted upon by the student body and faculty. While the proposed mascots were met with widespread criticism from many senior teachers and the student body, a new mascot was eventually settled upon.

Organization

Campus
From 1892 to 2017, Collegiate occupied several buildings on 77th and 78th Streets on the Upper West Side of Manhattan. The former schoolhouse on West 77th Street is, together with the adjoining West End Collegiate Church, an historic landmark in the City of New York.

In 2013, the school announced that it would move to a new location and in January 2018, Collegiate moved into a new facility at 301 Freedom Place South. The school has common areas dedicated to each division that provide space for independent study, social interactions, and divisional activities.

The Lower School is located on floors 2 and 3. The Middle School occupies floors 8 and 9. It has its own Maker Space, along with flexible classrooms, a Middle School Center and large, modern group study spaces. The Upper School is housed on floors 5 and 6. It is larger than the division's previous space and is next to the library. It has flexible classrooms and common areas that promote interaction among students and faculty.

Sciences for all three divisions are on floor 7. Visual arts and music occupy floor 4, with music practice spaces, art studios, and a digital photo lab. On the Lower Level is a 307-seat auditorium and a black-box theater for Collegiate's drama program. Collegiate's athletics are in the Lower Level and include a high school regulation-size gym for the basketball teams. The gym can be partitioned to provide PE classes and practice space simultaneously. An additional gym, the Alumni Gym, can accommodate wrestling competitions and half-court basketball and has a retractable batting cage.

Outdoor space consists of a large roof deck on floor 9 with a large recreation area and a ground-level, 5,000-square-foot courtyard for handball and basketball.

Structure
Each grade has around 50 boys. Those who attend Collegiate for all 12 years are nicknamed "Survivors". The school is divided into Lower School (Kindergarten-Grade 4), Middle School (Grades 5–8), and Upper School (Grades 9-12). More than a quarter of Collegiate teachers have a PhD.

The school is private, and it functions under a New York City non-profit statute enacted in the 1940s. Collegiate is controlled by a Board of Trustees, and the school is administered by a Head of School.

Leadership
Collegiate School was headed by Lee M. Levison from July 1, 2006, until June 30, 2020. He was preceded by W. Lee Pierson, the interim Head of School after the departure of Kerry P. Brennan in 2004. Levison announced his intention to retire in December 2018, causing the board of trustees to begin a search for his replacement. 
 
On May 31, 2019, the Board of Trustees unanimously voted to appoint David S. Lourie, Head of the St. Anne's-Belfield School since 2009, as Collegiate's 29th Head of School. He began his tenure upon Levison's retirement on July 1, 2020.

Rankings
In 2007, The Wall Street Journal ranked Collegiate first in the world in terms of percent of the senior class matriculating to eight selective American colleges.

Sports and co-curricular activities
The school's athletic success has mainly been with the varsity basketball, baseball, track and field, soccer, and cross country teams. The Collegiate soccer team won the NYSAIS state championship in 2010, 2011, and 2012.| The Collegiate varsity basketball team won five straight state championships in 2008, 2009, 2010, 2011 and 2012. The Collegiate cross country team won 25 Ivy League Championships in a row from 1990 to 2014. The Collegiate wrestling team won their first Ivy League and NYSAIS titles in 2022. Collegiate also has a golf and tennis team. Students not participating in a sport take physical education. Yearly fitness tests are administered in the lower and middle schools.

The school has a number of clubs, especially in the Upper School, including The Collegiate Journal. its newspaper operating since 1932; The Dutchman, the yearbook published every year since 1906; and Prufrock. its literary magazine, first published in 1973.

Notable alumni

 George Axelrod, 1940, playwright
 Jason Beghe, 1978, actor
 David Benioff, 1988, author and screenwriter
 Egbert Benson, 1760, a Founding Father of the United States, member of the U.S. House of Representatives, 1st Attorney General of New York, and founder of the New-York Historical Society
 George Platt Brett, 1911, chairman of MacMillan Publishing
 Peter Bogdanovich, 1957, filmmaker and author
 Benjamin Bronfman, 2000, entrepreneur and musician
 Edgar Bronfman Jr., 1973, CEO of Warner Music Group
 Dan Cogan, 1987, producer and director
 Jeff Cowen, 1984, American photographer
 Joseph Cullman, 1930, businessman and CEO of Philip Morris cigarette company from 1957 to 1978
 Matthew Daddario, 2006, actor
 Christopher d'Amboise, 1978, An American dancer, choreographer, writer, and theater director

 Samuel Dickson, c.1820 member of the U.S. House of Representatives from New York

 David Duchovny, 1978, Golden Globe-winning actor and director
 Nabil Fahmy, 1968, Egyptian diplomat and politician and Minister of Foreign Affairs (2013-2014)
 Douglas Fairbanks Jr., 1926, actor and World War II naval officer

 William Finley, 1958, actor
 Edward Glaeser, 1984, economics professor
 Matt Haimovitz, 1989, cellist
 John Hermann, 1980, musician in Widespread Panic
 Paul Hodes, 1968, U.S. Representative from New Hampshire
 Robert Hollander, 1951, American academic
 Zachary Karabell, 1985, businessman and writer, contributing editor for Politico
 Bill Keenan, 2004, professional ice hockey player
 Douglas Kennedy, 1972, novelist
 John F. Kennedy, Jr., class of 1978 (left after 10th grade), son of President John F. Kennedy
 John Kosner, 1978, writer head of espn.com
 Bill Kristol, 1970, Chief of Staff to the Vice President of the United States (1989-1993) for Dan Quayle, and founder and editor of The Weekly Standard
 Christopher Krovatin, 2003, author and musician
 John Langeloth Loeb Jr., 1940, businessman and United States Ambassador to Denmark
 Nicholas M. Loeb, 1993, businessman and actor
 Ben Lyons, 2000, film critic and TV personality
 Ian McGinnis, 1997, NCAA Division I men's basketball leading rebounder
 Taylor Mali, 1983, poet and humorist
 Walter Murch, 1961 Oscar-winning editor, sound designer, and filmmaker, referred to as "the most respected film editor and sound designer in the modern cinema"
 James M. Nack, 1825, poet
 John Bertram Oakes, 1929, journalist known for his early commitment to the environment, civil rights, and opposition to the Vietnam War; creator of the modern op-ed page.
 Alexander Olch, 2003, designer
 Jeffrey Orridge, 1978, commissioner of the Canadian Football League
 Bill Perkins, 1968, New York State Senator (2007-2017) and member of the New York City Council
 Dan-el Padilla Peralta, 2002, classicist
 Alex Prud'homme, journalist
 Ben Rhodes, 1996, Deputy National Security Advisor for Strategic Communication and speechwriter for President Barack Obama
 David Rhodes, 1994, President of CBS News
 Jack Richardson, 1951, essayist and playwright known for existentialist drama

 John A. Roebling II (1867-1952), engineer and philanthropist.
 Cesar Romero, 1926, actor
 Mark Ronson, 1993, Grammy-winning producer and DJ

 Andrew Rossi 1991, documentary filmmaker
 Alex Rubens, 1996, writer for Key and Peele and Rick and Morty
 John Rubinstein, 1964, actor
 Jack Schlossberg, 2011, only male surviving descendant of John F. Kennedy
 Serge Schmemann, 1963, writer and editor for the International Herald Tribune, Pulitzer Prize winner with The New York Times
 Wallace Shawn, 1961, actor
 Michael Shnayerson, 1972, contributing editor, Vanity Fair
 Arthur Ochs Sulzberger Jr., 1969, former publisher, The New York Times
 Anthony Shorris, 1974, first deputy mayor of New York City
 Sam Sifton, 1984, The New York Times restaurant critic
 Robert F. X. Sillerman, 1966, media entrepreneur
* Vivek Tiwary, 1991, writer and theater producer
 Luis Ubiñas, 1981, former president of the Ford Foundation
 Stephanus Van Cortlandt, c. 1655, member of the Board of Deacons (1672), Mayor of New York City
 Cornelius Vanderbilt II, 1859, son of William Henry Vanderbilt and grandson of Cornelius Vanderbilt
 Andrew Wagner, 1981, filmmaker
 Kenneth Webb, 1902, film director, screenwriter, and composer
 John Weidman, 1964, playwright
 Paul Weitz, 1983, filmmaker and playwright
 James Warren, 1971, journalist, Washington Bureau chief for the New York Daily News

 Billy Wirth, 1980, actor and director
 David Wise, 1972, screenwriter
 Alex York, pop singer-songwriter
 J. Peder Zane, 1980, journalist and author

Affiliated organizations
 Ivy Preparatory School League
 National Association of Independent Schools
 New York State Association of Independent Schools
 Interschool

Notes
1. The History and Symbols Task Force has recommended that this motto be removed, owing to its explicit religious nature.

References

External links

 

Boys' schools in New York City
Preparatory schools in New York City
Educational institutions established in the 1620s
West End Avenue
Upper West Side
Private elementary schools in Manhattan
Private middle schools in Manhattan
Private high schools in Manhattan
1628 establishments in the Dutch Empire
1628 establishments in North America
The Collegiate School alumni
Ivy Preparatory School League
Establishments in New Netherland